Tanaecia calliphorus is an Indomalayan butterfly of the family Nymphalidae (Limenitidinae). It is endemic to the Philippines.

Subspecies
T. c. calliphorus (Philippines: Luzon, Polillo, Babuyanes)
T. c. smaragdifera Fruhstorfer, 1913 (Philippines: Mindoro)
T. c. volupia Tsukada & Nishiyama, 1981 (Philippines: Camiguin)

References

Tanaecia
Butterflies described in 1861
Butterflies of Asia
Endemic fauna of the Philippines
Taxa named by Baron Cajetan von Felder
Taxa named by Rudolf Felder